Nancy Kassop is a professor at the State University of New York at New Paltz,  and former chair of the Political Science Department at the school. Some of the courses she teaches are American Government and Politics and Constitutional Law.

Biography
Kassop graduated from the University of Pennsylvania with a B.A. in Political Science and earned her Ph.D and M.A. in political science from New York University.

Her research focuses on constitutional law and the Presidency. Among her many articles and publications is "Expansion and Contraction: Clinton's Impact on the Scope of Presidential Power" from her book titled The Presidency and the Law: The Clinton Legacy by Adler and Genovese and "A Political Question By Any Other Name: Government Strategy in the Enemy Combatant Cases of Hamdi and Padilla" from her Lexington Books 2007 publication "The Political Question Doctrine and the Supreme Court of the United States."

Since the George W. Bush administration, her focus has shifted towards presidential war powers and national security law. Some of her most recent research explores the role of the Obama administration's political staff and Office of Legal Counsel in making counterterrorism policy.

Personal life

Kassop was born April 1, 1950, in New York, to Harry Kassop and Harriet (Weinberger) Kassop. Her maternal grandfather Emanuel Weinberger was a Jewish immigrant from Austria. Her maternal grandmother Eva Cohen was born in New York to Russian Jewish parents. Harry Kassop was also Ashkenazi Jewish.

References

External links
 Faculty page at SUNY New Paltz
 
 

Living people
University of Pennsylvania alumni
New York University alumni
American educators
American women political scientists
American political scientists
21st-century American women
Year of birth missing (living people)